Ken Cook is president and co-founder of the Environmental Working Group (EWG), a non-profit, non-partisan organization dedicated to protecting human health and the environment. Cook has written dozens of articles, opinion pieces, and reports on environmental, public health, and agricultural topics. He has been an active lobbyist for over 20 years.

Career
Cook has been named as one of Washington's Top Lobbyists by The Hill and The Huffington Post. He has made multiple appearances on The News Hour With Jim Lehrer, CBS's 60 Minutes, National Public Radio, and the evening newscasts of ABC, NBC, CBS, and CNN among other programs.

Cook started the Environmental Working Group in 1993, and since its inception they have provided research geared to reforming agriculture policy, advancing conservation techniques and environmental protection. At the onset of debate over the 1995 Farm Bill, the EWG compiled information on who received the money set aside for conservation efforts. The data sets "sift[ed] through a complex web of corporations, partnerships and other business entities," which allowed the USDA to assign specific dollar amounts to the individuals behind the businesses.

In the 1990s, EWG’s research was a major factor in the passage of the landmark pesticide reform law, the Food Quality Protection Act. EWG was among the first to draw attention to the health threat posed by the weed-killer atrazine and conducted the first extensive tests for the chemical in tap water in 29 Midwest cities. In the last several years Cook and EWG have been in the forefront of national and state campaigns to require the labeling of foods that contain genetically engineered ingredients.

A front-page profile in the Omaha World Herald in 1996 said, "Cook's fingerprints can be found on nearly two decades of U.S. farm law." In 2000, Progressive Farmer named Cook one of agriculture's most influential leaders in the 20th century, alongside advocates like Rachel Carson and Aldo Leopold.

Cook has appeared as himself in the documentaries King Corn (2007), The World According to Monsanto (2008), A Place at the Table (2012), and Pricele$$ (2012).

Cook is a board member of Food Policy Action (and founding chairman), Organic Voices and the Amazon Conservation Team and a former member of the board of the Organic Center

Personal
Cook graduated from the University of Missouri in Columbia, Missouri with an M.S. in Soil Science. He is married to environmental leader Deb Callahan.  Ken is a native of Affton, Missouri and went to Vianney High School.

Cook also has a B.A. in history and a B.S. in agriculture.

References

External links
 Huffington Post article
 The Atlantic news article
 

American environmentalists
Sustainable agriculture
Living people
University of Missouri alumni
People from Affton, Missouri
Year of birth missing (living people)